Achernar is the brightest star in the constellation of Eridanus, and the ninth-brightest in the night sky. It has the Bayer designation Alpha Eridani, which is Latinized from α Eridani and abbreviated Alpha Eri or α Eri. The name Achernar applies to the primary component of a binary system.

Of the ten apparent brightest stars in the night-time sky, Alpha Eridani is the hottest and bluest in color, due to Achernar being of spectral type B. Achernar has an unusually rapid rotational velocity, causing it to become oblate in shape.

Nomenclature
α Eridani (Latinised to Alpha Eridani) is the system's Bayer designation. The designations of the two components—Alpha Eridani A and B—derive from the convention used by the Washington Multiplicity Catalog (WMC) for multiple star systems, and adopted by the International Astronomical Union (IAU).

The system bears the traditional name of Achernar (sometimes spelled Achenar), derived from the Arabic  , meaning "The End of the River".  However, it seems that this name originally referred to Theta Eridani instead, which latterly was known by the similar traditional name Acamar, with the same etymology. The IAU Working Group on Star Names (WGSN) approved the name with the spelling Achernar for the component Alpha Eridani A on 30 June 2016 and it is now so included in the List of IAU-approved Star Names.

The indigenous Boorong people of northwestern Victoria, Australia, named it Yerrerdetkurrk.

Namesake
USS Achernar (AKA-53) was a United States Navy attack cargo ship.

Properties
Achernar is in the deep southern sky and never rises above the horizon beyond 33°N, roughly the latitude of Dallas, Texas. It is best seen from the Southern Hemisphere in November; it is circumpolar above (i.e. south of) 33°S, roughly the latitude of Santiago. On this latitude, e.g. the south coast of South Africa (Cape Town to Port Elizabeth) when in lower culmination it is barely visible to the naked eye as it is only 1 degree above the horizon, but still circumpolar. Further south, it is well visible at all times during night.

Achernar is a bright, blue star with about six times the mass of the Sun. It has a stellar classification of B6 Vep, but despite appearing similar to a main sequence star, it is thought to have recently exhausted the hydrogen in its core and begun to evolve away from the main sequence. It has expanded to an average radius eight times the Sun's and is about 3,000 times more luminous. Infrared observations of the star using an adaptive optics system on the Very Large Telescope show that it has a companion star in a close orbit. This appears to be an A-type star in the stellar classification range A0V–A3V, which suggests a stellar mass of about double that of the Sun.

The brightness of Achernar varies very slightly, by a maximum of 0.06 magnitudes or about 6%. The longest periods are very similar to the rotation period of the star, although the exact period appears to vary as the rotational velocity of its upper atmosphere changes. The shortest periods may be harmonics of the longer periods. The variability type of Achernar is given only as a Be star and the exact causes of the brightness changes are unknown. The star itself appears to pulsate and the disk around it varies in size and shape as well as apparently disappearing at times.

As of 2015, Achernar was the least spherical star known in the Milky Way. It spins so rapidly that it has assumed the shape of an oblate spheroid with an equatorial diameter 35% greater than its polar diameter. The polar axis is inclined about 60.6° to the line of sight from the Earth. Since it is actually a binary star, its highly distorted shape may cause non-negligible departures of the companion's orbital trajectory with respect to a Keplerian ellipse. A similar situation occurs for the star Regulus.

Because of the distorted shape of this star, there is a significant temperature variation by latitude. The high polar temperatures are generating a fast polar wind that is ejecting matter from the star, creating a polar envelope of hot gas and plasma. The entire star is surrounded by an extended envelope that can be detected by its excess infrared emission, or by its polarization. The presence of a circumstellar disk of ionized gas is a common feature of Be stars such as this. The disk is not stable and periodically decretes back into the star. The maximum polarization for Achernar's disk was observed in September 2014, and it is now decreasing.

Co-moving companion
The red dwarf 2MASS J01375879−5645447 lies about half a degree north of Achernar.  It has been identified as being at the same distance and sharing a common proper motion, as well as being of about the same age.  The projected separation of the two is slightly over one light year and they would not be gravitationally bound, but it is proposed that both are part of the Tucana-Horologium association.

Historical visibility
Due to precession, Achernar lay much farther south in ancient times than at present, being 7.5 degrees off the south pole around 3400 BCE (declination ) and still lying at declination  by around 1500 BCE. Hence the Ancient Egyptians could not have known it. So, Ptolemy's "End of the River" was certainly Theta Eridani. Alpha Eridani was not visible from Alexandria until about 1600.

Until about March 2000, Achernar and Fomalhaut were the two first-magnitude stars farthest from any other, their nearest neighbors being each other. Antares is now the most isolated first-magnitude star, although Antares is located in a constellation (Scorpius) with many bright second-magnitude stars, whereas the stars surrounding Alpha Eridani and Fomalhaut are considerably fainter.

The first star catalogue to contain Achernar in the chart of Eridanus is Johann Bayer's Uranometria. Bayer did not observe it himself, and it is attributed to Pieter Dirkszoon Keyser and the first voyages of the Dutch to the East Indies ("Eerste Schipvaart"). Thus it was the only first-magnitude star not listed in Ptolemy's Almagest.

Alpha Eridani will continue to move north in the next few millennia, reaching its maximum northern declination between the 8th and 11th millennia, when it will be visible as far north as Germany and southern England.

Notes

References

Further reading
 

B-type main-sequence stars
Be stars

Eridanus (constellation)
Eridani, Alpha
0472
CD-57 00334
010144
007588
Southern pole stars
Achernar
Achernar